The Squam River is a  river located in central New Hampshire in the United States. The river is the outlet of Squam Lake, the second-largest lake in New Hampshire, and it is a tributary of the Pemigewasset River, which itself is a tributary of the Merrimack River.

The Squam River first appears as a narrow channel in Holderness, New Hampshire, between Squam Lake and Little Squam Lake downstream. The two lakes have the same elevation, due to a dam below the outlet to Little Squam, so the river in Holderness village is not free-flowing. Below Little Squam Lake the river proceeds south for over a mile before reaching the dam which controls the two lakes' water level. Below this point, the river quickly reaches the backwater from a mill dam in the town of Ashland.

Below the center of town, the river wanders southeast under railroad tracks and Interstate 93 and past the Ashland sewage treatment plant before entering the Pemigewasset River in the northwest corner of the town of New Hampton.

See also

List of rivers of New Hampshire

References

Tributaries of the Merrimack River
Rivers of New Hampshire
Rivers of Grafton County, New Hampshire
New Hampshire placenames of Native American origin